The men's heptathlon event  at the 2001 IAAF World Indoor Championships was held on March 10–11.

Results

References
Results

Heptathlon
Combined events at the World Athletics Indoor Championships